The Strange Case of the End of Civilization as We Know It is a 1977 comedy film directed by Joseph McGrath and starring John Cleese. It is a low-budget spoof of the Sherlock Holmes detective series, as well as the mystery genre in general.

Plot
Aboard a private aircraft, Dr. Gropinger (Ron Moody)—a parody of Henry Kissinger—is on a goodwill tour of Middle Eastern countries. He misplaces his diary and is thrown into a panic as, without the diary, he no longer knows what country he is about to land in. Stepping off the plane, he extends greetings in Hebrew to a congregation of Arabs and is shot dead. Soon after, the U.S. President (Joss Ackland, in a caricature of Gerald Ford) receives a threatening letter claiming responsibility for the death, signed "Moriarty", who claims to have set in motion a plan that will allow him to rule the world. The president dispatches a top agent to London to work with the world's top law enforcement officials and find a strategy to combat Moriarty.

Headed by an incompetent Englishman (Denholm Elliott), the committee settles on contacting Arthur Sherlock Holmes (John Cleese), an eccentric private detective with an affinity for certain addictive drugs (a nod to the literary Sherlock Holmes' experience with cocaine). Holmes is entrusted by the Commissioner of Police (Stratford Johns) to find the descendant of Moriarty before he gains control of the world, accompanied by the descendant of Dr. Watson (Arthur Lowe), who is both a medical doctor and utter fool. The commissioner is murdered while trying to leave, his death mainly the result of Watson's rampant stupidity.

The duo then proceed to Scotland Yard to discuss the situation with the committee. Before any plans can be made, most of the committee members are murdered by a sniper. Without their help, Holmes concocts a plan to invite the world's great detectives to a party, with the hope of laying a trap for Moriarty, who will be unable to pass up a chance at attacking all of them at once. Many fictional detectives attend, including Sam Spade, Columbo, and Hercule Poirot, all of whom are dispatched while Holmes and Watson do a crossword. The murderer is revealed to an exact doppelgänger of Watson, leading to great confusion when Holmes cannot determine who is the real Watson, particularly when Watson himself is too stupid to know which is which.

After some clever deduction, Holmes discovers who the real Watson is, and the doppelgänger is revealed to be Moriarty's grandchild, who is in fact Holmes' landlady Mrs. Hudson (Connie Booth). Holding Holmes and Watson at gunpoint, she tells them of her long-simmering plan to avenge her grandfather's death by destroying civilization. She shoots Dr. Watson and proceeds to riddle Holmes with (an impossible number of) bullets, which he survives, revealing he suspected her all along and so asked Watson to load her gun with blanks. As Holmes gloats, Watson sheepishly tells him that he forgot to switch the bullets; Holmes realizes he's been shot for real, and dies.

Cast

See also
Murder by Death

External links 
 
 

British parody films
1977 films
1970s comedy mystery films
Sherlock Holmes films
Sherlock Holmes pastiches
1970s parody films
Films with screenplays by John Cleese
Films directed by Joseph McGrath (film director)
British comedy mystery films
1977 comedy films
1970s English-language films
1970s British films